Karin Thomas (born 3 October 1961 in Brusio) is a Swiss cross-country skier who competed from 1982 to 1988. She finished sixth in the 4 × 5 km relay at the 1984 Winter Olympics in Sarajevo and fourth in that same event at the 1988 Winter Olympics in Calgary.

At the 1985 FIS Nordic World Ski Championships in Seefeld, Thomas finished 15th in the 10 km event and 18th in the 20 km event. Her best World Cup finish was third in a 20 km event in Italy in 1986.

Cross-country skiing results
All results are sourced from the International Ski Federation (FIS).

Olympic Games

World Championships

World Cup

Season standings

Individual podiums
1 podium

References

External links

Women's 4 x 5 km cross-country relay Olympic results: 1976-2002 

Cross-country skiers at the 1984 Winter Olympics
Cross-country skiers at the 1988 Winter Olympics
Living people
Swiss female cross-country skiers
1961 births
20th-century Swiss women